During the 1942–43 English football season, Brentford competed in the Football League South, due to the cessation of competitive football for the duration of the Second World War. Early in a mid-table season for the club, inside forward Len Townsend notably scored six goals in a 9–4 victory over Brighton & Hove Albion, the most-ever in any match by a Brentford player.

Season summary
Brentford returned to the Football League South for the 1942–43 season with cause for optimism, having generated over £20,000 (equivalent to £ in ) from the semi-finals and the final of the club's victorious 1941–42 London War Cup campaign. Again the first team squad would be hit by a lack of unavailability of players, with no goalkeeper available for the second season in succession. Despite averaging only 12 appearances per season since the war began, centre forward Len Townsend had been averaging nearly a goal a game and was in fantastic form, scoring 17 goals in a 17 match spell, including six in a 9–4 victory over Brighton & Hove Albion on 12 September 1942. The record of six goals in a single match bettered the official club record of five, but due to the unofficial nature of wartime football, Townsend does not hold the club record outright.

Brentford's league form held up until the turn of the year then fell apart, losing 10 of the final 15 matches of the season in all competitions. Guest forwards Eddie Perry and Douglas Hunt, who had scored the bulk of the team's goals since the beginning of the 1940–41 season failed to find the net with such regularity, though Albion Rovers' guest Tommy Kiernan notably scored 9 goals in his 10 appearances. The discontinuation of the London War Cup meant that the Bees would be unable to defend their crown, so the club were entered into the Football League South War Cup, which ended in elimination in the group stages. Brentford finished the league season in 9th place and Len Townsend scored 19 goals in 20 appearances.

League tables

Football League South

Football League South War Cup

Results 
Brentford's goal tally listed first.

Legend

Football League South

Football League South War Cup 

 Source: 100 Years Of Brentford

Playing squad 
 Players' ages are as of the opening day of the 1942–43 season.

 Sources: Timeless Bees, Football League Players' Records 1888 to 1939, 100 Years Of Brentford

Coaching staff

Statistics

Appearances and goals

Players listed in italics left the club mid-season.
Source: 100 Years Of Brentford

Goalscorers 

Players listed in italics left the club mid-season.
Source: 100 Years Of Brentford

Wartime international caps

Management

Summary

Transfers & loans 
Guest players' arrival and departure dates correspond to their first and last appearances of the season.

References 

Brentford F.C. seasons
Brentford